Frederick Sharp may refer to:

 Frederick Morton Sharp (1911–2002), Canadian politician in the Legislative Assembly of British Columbia
 Frederick Ralph Sharp (1915–1992), Royal Canadian Air Force officer